In logic,  (Latin for "reduction to absurdity"), also known as  (Latin for "argument to absurdity") or apagogical arguments, is the form of argument that attempts to establish a claim by showing that the opposite scenario would lead to absurdity or contradiction. This argument form traces back to Ancient Greek philosophy and has been used throughout history in both formal mathematical and philosophical reasoning, as well as in debate.

Examples 

The "absurd" conclusion of a reductio ad absurdum argument can take a range of forms, as these examples show:
 The Earth cannot be flat; otherwise, since the Earth is assumed to be finite in extent, we would find people falling off the edge.
 There is no smallest positive rational number because, if there were, then it could be divided by two to get a smaller one.

The first example argues that denial of the premise would result in a ridiculous conclusion, against the evidence of our senses. The second example is a mathematical proof by contradiction (also known as an indirect proof), which argues that the denial of the premise would result in a logical contradiction (there is a "smallest" number and yet there is a number smaller than it).

Greek philosophy
Reductio ad absurdum was used throughout Greek philosophy. The earliest example of a  argument can be found in a satirical poem attributed to Xenophanes of Colophon (c. 570 – c. 475 BCE). Criticizing Homer's attribution of human faults to the gods, Xenophanes states that humans also believe that the gods' bodies have human form. But if horses and oxen could draw, they would draw the gods with horse and ox bodies. The gods cannot have both forms, so this is a contradiction. Therefore, the attribution of other human characteristics to the gods, such as human faults, is also false.

Greek mathematicians proved fundamental propositions using reductio ad absurdum. Euclid of Alexandria (mid-4th – mid-3rd centuries BCE) and Archimedes of Syracuse (c. 287 – c. 212 BCE) are two very early examples.

The earlier dialogues of Plato (424–348 BCE), relating the discourses of Socrates, raised the use of  arguments to a formal dialectical method, also called the Socratic method. Typically, Socrates' opponent would make what would seem to be an innocuous assertion. In response, Socrates, via a step-by-step train of reasoning, bringing in other background assumptions, would make the person admit that the assertion resulted in an absurd or contradictory conclusion, forcing him to abandon his assertion and adopt a position of aporia. 

The technique was also a focus of the work of Aristotle (384–322 BCE), particularly in his Prior Analytics where he referred to it as (62b).

Buddhist philosophy
Much of Madhyamaka Buddhist philosophy centers on showing how various essentialist ideas have absurd conclusions through reductio ad absurdum arguments (known as prasaṅga - "consequence" - in Sanskrit). In the Mūlamadhyamakakārikā, Nāgārjuna's reductio ad absurdum arguments are used to show that any theory of substance or essence was unsustainable and therefore, phenomena (dharmas) such as change, causality, and sense perception were empty (sunya) of any essential existence.  Nāgārjuna's main goal is often seen by scholars as refuting the essentialism of certain Buddhist Abhidharma schools (mainly Vaibhasika) which posited theories of svabhava (essential nature) and also the Hindu Nyāya and Vaiśeṣika schools which posited a theory of ontological substances (dravyatas).

Principle of non-contradiction
Aristotle clarified the connection between contradiction and falsity in his principle of non-contradiction, which states that a proposition cannot be both true and false. That is, a proposition  and its negation  (not-Q) cannot both be true. Therefore, if a proposition and its negation can both be derived logically from a premise, it can be concluded that the premise is false. This technique, known as indirect proof or proof by contradiction, has formed the basis of  arguments in formal fields such as logic and mathematics.

See also

 Appeal to ridicule
 Argument from fallacy
 Contraposition
 List of Latin phrases
 Mathematical proof
 Prasangika
 Slippery slope
 Strawman

Sources 

 Pasti, Mary. Reductio Ad Absurdum: An Exercise in the Study of Population Change. United States, Cornell University, Jan., 1977.
 Daigle, Robert W.. The Reductio Ad Absurdum Argument Prior to Aristotle. N.p., San Jose State University, 1991.

References

External links

Latin logical phrases
Latin philosophical phrases
Theorems in propositional logic
Madhyamaka
Arguments
Pyrrhonism